Korona is an unincorporated community in Flagler County, Florida, United States. It is located north northeast of Favoretta on US 1, at the shared intersection of CRs 2002 and 325, south of Bunnell. The community is part of the Deltona–Daytona Beach–Ormond Beach, FL metropolitan statistical area.

References

Unincorporated communities in Flagler County, Florida
Unincorporated communities in Florida